Don't Make Any Plans for Tonight is a 2006 Italian drama film written and directed by Gianluca Maria Tavarelli.

It was screened in the Horizons section at the 63rd Venice International Film Festival, in which Micaela Ramazzotti won the Wella Award.

Plot 

The film follows the misguided, troubled lives of four men in their 40's living in a cold, aloof Rome.

Cast  
Luca Zingaretti as Andrea
Giorgio Tirabassi as Pietro
Andrea Renzi as  Alessandro
Alessandro Gassmann as Giorgio
Giuseppe Battiston as  Vittorio
Micaela Ramazzotti as  Veronica
Donatella Finocchiaro as  Paola
Valeria Milillo as Irene
Francesca Inaudi as Mariella
Paola Cortellesi as Cinzia
Valerio Binasco as Nanni
Rocco Papaleo as Nicola 
Michela Cescon as Iole
Zoe Tavarelli as Elena
Valeria Sabel as  Medium

See also  
 List of Italian films of 2004

References

External links

  
 
Italian drama films
2006 drama films
2006 films
2000s Italian-language films
2000s Italian films